MotesBooks is a publishing company based in Louisville, Kentucky, founded in 2006 by Kate Larken.  MotesBooks publishes works of fiction, non-fiction, poetry, anthologies, audio books, and books for young readers, including the Kentucky Hero Series.  In addition, MotesBooks produces literary community-building events that include workshops for writers and songwriters, annual literary suppers, and mentoring emerging writers.

Divisions of MotesBooks and Publications

MotesBooks Inc
Fiction

Novels
Tilt-a-Whirl (2010) by Tracy Coffee Gayle
The King of Gaheena (2008) by Squire Babcock
Pearl Maker (2006) by C.C. Wharton			

Short Stories
Ten Tongues (2010) Cyn Kitchen

Non-Fiction
Very Best of Kentucky Crosswords (2009) by Vicki A. Benge
Stories Told In Stone: Cemetery Iconology-A Manual for Genealogy Research (2009) by Gaylord Cooper
The Hurting Part: Evolution of an American Play (2008) by Silas House

Memoirs
Don't You Remember? (2007) by George Ella Lyon
Who Needs June Cleaver? (2007) by Constance Alexander

Essay Collections
Back To Abnormal (2010) by Dana Wildsmith		
Can A Democrat Get Into Heaven? (2006) by Anne Shelby

Poetry
Since The End (2010) by Alison Kolodinsky
This Gone Place (2010) by Lisa Parker
After The Garden (2009) by Charles A. Swanson
Kilroy Was Here (2008) by Constance Alexander
The Well String (2008) by Noel Smith
Her Secret Song (2008) by Jim Minick
Asymmetry (2007) by Judy Sizemore

Anthologies
Harvest of Fire: New & Collected Works of Lee Howard (2010) Edited by George Ella Lyon
We All Live Downstream: Writings about Mountaintop Removal (2009) Edited by Jason Howard
World Premieres from Horse Cave (2009) Edited by Liz Bussey Fentress & Warren Hammack

MOTIF Series
Vol. 2 - Come What May: an Anthology of Writings about Chance (2010) Edited by Marianne Worthington
Vol. 1 - Writing By Ear: an Anthology of Writings about Music (2009) Edited by Marianne Worthington

MotesBooks Audio
Two Stories (2008) by Silas House	Read by the author
Hey Diddle Diddle (2008) by Marie Davis   Read by the author
Can A Democrat Get Into Heaven? (2007) by Anne Shelby  12 Selections read by the author

MotesBooks Think Young Collection
Road To Pleasant Hill (2009) by Rebecca Mitchell Turney & Marie Mitchell
Here & Then (2009) by George Ella Lyon

Kentucky Hero Series
The Lucy Furman Story (2010) by Greta McDonough
Ring the Silver Bell: The Alice Slone Story (2008) by Nancy Kelly Allen

Community Building
Literary Events
The Gathering of Writers and Songwriters
Annual Literary Supper

Notable Contributors
Wendell Berry
Robert F. Kennedy Jr.
Silas House
Ashley Judd
Erik Reece
Jason Howard
Patty Griffin
George Ella Lyon
Anne Shelby
Julie Miller & Buddy Miller
Gurney Norman

References

http://shakinglikeamountain.com/shaking/2009/05/01/motesbooks-releases-motif-writing-by-ear-an-anthology-of-writings-about-music/
http://blogs.wvgazette.com/coaltattoo/category/books/
http://www.kentuckytourism.com/events/details/motes-books-the-gathering-of-writers--songwriter/12695/

External links
http://www.MotesBooks.com

Publishing companies of the United States
Publishing companies established in 2006